This is a list of Oregon judges that have served within the confines of the United States in the state of Oregon, as well as people from Oregon that have served in federal courts outside of the state. These include judges that served prior to statehood on February 14, 1859, including the judges of the Provisional Government of Oregon. Those listed include judges of the Oregon Supreme Court, the Oregon Tax Court, and the Oregon Court of Appeals at the state level. Judges for the United States District Court for the District of Oregon and judges from Oregon that have served on other federal courts are also listed. The judges of the Oregon circuit courts, who generally serve a single county, are not listed.

Pre-Provisional Government
John Kirk Townsend is recorded to have served as a judge prior to the establishment of the Provisional Government of Oregon.

Provisional Government

Formation process of the Provisional Government 
No formal judicial system existed in the region prior to February 18, 1841, when settlers at the Champoeg Meetings, in their effort to form a Provisional Government, elected Babcock as Supreme Judge as well as four justices of the peace and a High Sheriff as minor executive position, while they failed to establish the introduction of a governor because of discontent by French-Canadian settlers. That meant that Babcock also acted as executive and law-maker until the establishment of an Executive Committee in 1843.

Creation of the Provisional Government 
On May 2, 1843, the Provisional Government of Oregon was finally created through a narrow 52–50 vote under the English American and French Canadian settlers. This government constructed a judicial system headed by a single Supreme Judge.

Oregon Supreme Court

The Oregon Territory was created in 1848 by the United States Congress. Congress then created a three judge supreme court for the territory. In 1859, the territory became the state of Oregon, with the Oregon Supreme Court remaining, eventually expanded to seven justices.

Oregon Court of Appeals
In 1969, the state of Oregon created an intermediate level appeals court. Judges from the Oregon Court of Appeals decide cases appealed from the Oregon Circuit Court. The court has a total of thirteen judgeships.

Federal district court

Upon Oregon's entry into the Union, the federal government created the United States District Court for the District of Oregon, a federal trial level court. At first there was a single judge, but currently there are six judgeships. Those who have served as the chief judge are listed in italics.

Other federal

Judges from Oregon who have served on federal courts other than the District Court of Oregon. This includes judges who have been assigned to the Ninth Circuit Court of Appeals' duty station at the Pioneer Courthouse in Portland, Oregon.

Oregon Tax Court
In 1962, the state of Oregon created a specialized court to handle state tax cases. The Oregon Tax Court consists of a single state-wide elected judge.

See also
 Lists of Oregon-related topics

References

 
 
 
Judges
Oregon
Judges